Tenthredo colon is a sawfly species belonging to the family Tenthredinidae (common sawflies).

Description
These sawflies have black head and thorax. Abdomen is black with a reddish area  towards the tip. Legs are reddish. Antennae are black, with white tips. The larvae are pale brown with a characteristic diamond pattern of diagonal cross lines and a darker brown mark on the head.

Biology
The adults can be encountered from May through August feeding on nectar (especially on Anthriscus sylvestris). The larvae can be found in September. They are polyphagous, but mainly feed on leaves of Epilobium hirsutum,  Chamerion angustifolium, Pteridium aquilinum and Salix.

Distribution and habitat
This species can be found in hedgerows in most of Europe and the Nearctic realm.

References

Magis N. (2003) - Notes faunistiques sur les espèces du genre Tenthredo Linné, 1758 sensu lato dans la région franco-rhénane (Hymenoptera Symphyta : Tenthredinidae, Tenthredininae) - Notes fauniques de Gembloux, n° 53

External links
 Artsdatabanken

Tenthredinidae
Insects described in 1814